The women's kumite 68 kg competition in karate at the 2017 World Games took place on 26 July 2017 at the GEM Sports Complex in Wrocław, Poland.

Results

Elimination round

Group A

Group B

Finals
{{#invoke:RoundN|N4
|widescore=yes|bold_winner=high|team-width=200
|RD1=Semifinals
|3rdplace=yes

|||1||2
||{{flagIOC2athlete|Alisa Buchinger|AUT|2017 World Games}}|4||0

||{{flagIOC2athlete|Lamya Matoub|ALG|2017 World Games}}|0||0

||

References

Karate at the 2017 World Games
2017 World Games
2017 in women's karate